The annual Wallace Art Awards are the largest and longest-running art awards of their type in New Zealand. They were established by James Wallace in 1992. Awards are made for contemporary painting, sculpture and photography and are run by the James Wallace Charitable Arts Trust. The 2018 awards were presented by the Rt Hon Dame Patsy Reddy at the Pah Homestead, Auckland on 3 September 2018. The awards were cancelled in 2021 with a statement on their website saying: "The Trust is currently refreshing our strategic plan and reviewing the awards will form part of this work."

Paramount Award

 1992 Mark Braunias
 1993 Jeff Brown
 1994 Bill Hammond
 1995 Fatu Feu'u
 1996 Jenny Dolezel
 1997 Peter Stichbury
 1998 Elizabeth Thomson
 1999 Bing Dawe
 2000 Gregor Kregar
 2001 Peter Gibson Smith
 2002 Judy Millar
 2003 Jeffrey Harris
 2004 Jim Speers
 2005 Sara Hughes
 
 2006 Rohan Wealleans
 2007 James Robinson
 2008 Richard Lewer
 2009 Marcus Williams and Susan Jowsey
 2010 Sam Mitchell
 2011 Akiko Diegel
 2012 Shigeyuki Kihara
2013 Jae Hoon Lee
2014 Roger Mortimer
2015 Visesio Siasau
2016 Andre Hemer
2017 Andy Leleisi'uao
2018 Imogen Taylor
2019 Bob Jahnke
2020 Russ Flatt

Jury Award 
This award began in 2005.

 2005 Glenn Burrell, runner up Robert McLeod
 2006 Hamish Palmer
 2007 Megan Jenkinson
 2008 Gary McMillan and Kathy Barry
 2009 Turnskin Kingdom
 2010 Robyn Hoonhout
 2011 Philip Dadson
 2012 Erica van Zon
 2013 Madeleine Child
 2014 Stephen Ellis
 2015 Andrea du Chatenier
 2016 Cachemaille Bowmast
 2017 James Oram
 2018 Paul McLachlan (artist)
2019 Andrea du Chatenier & Andrew Rankin
2020 Wanda Gillespie

People’s Choice Award 
This award began in 2005.

 2005 tie between Claire Beynon, Matthew Browne, and Martha Lundmark
 2006 Martin Ball
 2007 Lianne Edwards
 2008 No award given
 2009 No award given
 2010 Sam Foley
 2011 Susanne Kerr
 2012 Gareth Price
 2013 Mark Rutledge
 2014 Stephen Ellis
 2015 Wei Lun Ha
 2016 Ebony Boskovic Mokofisi
 2017 No award given

The Wallace Arts Trust Vermont Award Winner 
From 2006–2007 known as the Development Award, 2008–2009 as the Park Lane Wallace Trust Development Award, 2006–2013 as the Wallace Arts Trust Development Award.

 2006 Maryrose Crook
 2007 Lianne Edwards, runners-up Kirsten Roberts and Andrea du Chatenier
 2008 Ruth Cleland, first runner up Matthew Couper, second runner up Liyen Chong
 2009 Chloe Marsters, first runner up Matt Arbuckle, second runner up Philip Jarvis
 2010 Graham Fletcher, first runner up Simon Esling, second runner up Iain Cheesman
 2011 Bronwynne Cornish, first runner up Emil McAvoy, second runner up Anita Levering
 2012 Katie Theunissen, first runner up Karin Hofko, second runner up Tessa Laird
 2013 Julia deVille, first runner up Marita Hewitt, second runner up Glen Hayward
 2014 David McCracken, first runner up Raewyn Turner and Brian Harris, Noel Ivanoff
 2015 Russ Flatt, first runner up Rose Meyer, second runner up Virginia Were
 2016 Weilun Ha, first runner up Matthew Browne, second runner up Antje Barke
 2017 Matt Arbuckle, first runner up, Christina Read, second runner up Matthew Couper
 2018 Andrea du Chatenier

Glaister Ennor Award 
This award was only given in 2006.
 2006 Peter Madden, first runner up Heather Straka, second runner up Andrew McLeod

The Kaipara Foundation Wallace Trust Award 
This award began in 2008.

 2008 Heather Straka
 2009 Linden Simmons
 2010 Glen Hayward
 2011 Matt Ellwood
 2012 John Brown
 2013 Sam Foley
 2014 Glen Hayward
 2015 Hugo Lindsay
 2016 Jeremy Blincoe
 2017 Rebecca Swan
 2018 Peata Larkin

Fulbright-Wallace Arts Trust Award 
This award began in 2009.

 2009 Richard Maloy
 2010 Mark Braunias
 2011 Brydee Rood
 2012 Steve Carr
 2013 Steve Rood
 2014 Ruth Watson
 2015 Phil Dadson
 2016 Simon Morris
 2017 Shannon Novak
 2018 Emma Fitts

The British School at Rome Residency Award Winner 
This award began in 2017.

 2017 Deborah Rundle
 2018 Lucy Meyle
 2019 Wendelien Bakker

Martin Tate Wallace Artist Residency Award 
This award is by invitation only, and is awarded to a senior artist who is unlikely to apply for a Wallace Award.

 2018 Richard Maloy

References

Contemporary art awards
New Zealand art awards